The Middleman is an American television series. The series, which was developed for television by Javier Grillo-Marxuach for ABC Family, is based on the Viper Comics series, The Middleman, created by Grillo-Marxuach and Les McClaine. The series ran for one season in 2008.

Originally confirmed for an initial 13 episodes, the order was reduced to a 12-episode season due to low ratings. In February 2009, a comic book based on the unproduced 13th episode was announced, confirming the series' cancellation. Billed as a "series finale", The Middleman – The Doomsday Armageddon Apocalypse was released in July 2009. The complete series DVD set was released by Shout! Factory on July 28, 2009.

Premise 
Wendy Watson, a struggling artist, is recruited by a secret agency to fight against evil forces. Wendy lives in an illegal sublet apartment with her young, photogenic, animal activist friend Lacey. The Middleman is a freelance fixer of "exotic problems", which include mad scientists bent on taking over the world, hostile aliens, and various supernatural threats, aided by Ida, a robot in the form of a grumpy schoolmarm. Because of Wendy Watson's coolness under pressure and photographic memory, the Middleman recruits her to become the next Middleman-in-training. Wendy struggles to balance her world-saving adventures with her friendships with Lacey and her neighbor Noser.

The series includes numerous pop-culture references. For example, in the first episode, Wendy calls herself "Robin the Boy Hostage", a quote from the comic book The Dark Knight Returns by Frank Miller; that same episode features a super-intelligent ape who murders several members of the Italian Mafia and spouts catchphrases from American movies about the Mafia, such as Scarface, Goodfellas and The Godfather.

Cast and characters 

 The Middleman – Matt Keeslar
 Wendy Watson – Natalie Morales
 Ida – Mary Pat Gleason
 Lacey Thornfield – Brit Morgan
 Noser – Jake Smollett

Episodes

Season 1 (2008)

Unfilmed episode 
While the episode was never filmed, the show's cast have performed a live reading of the episode script during the 2009 San Diego ComicCon. They are planning to release the video of the reading online.  The script for this episode was later turned into a graphic novel published by Viper comics.  This graphic novel, The Middleman: The Doomsday Armageddon Apocalypse, is intended to act as the TV series finale.

Critical reception
The A.V. Club gave the entire series a A−. Daily Variety wrote that "this series could potentially work on any number of networks, and it's almost too smart for the room at ABC Family; nevertheless, this sprightly summer arrival should fit nicely into the evolving niche the channel established with Kyle XY." TV Guide had it as its "Mega Rave" for the week of June 15, 2008, and wrote that "It's loaded with clever banterlike Men in Black if Will Smith's character was a geeky girl." UGO gave it an A− overall and an A for story, calling it "fun to watch." The Boston Herald gave it a B− and wrote that "all that's missing are some onscreen blurbs like 'BAM!' and 'POW!'" Newsarama wrote that "stylistically, the current show this most resembles is Pushing Daisies, with its colorful sets and rapid-fire screwball dialogue" and that "it's about goofy ideas and having a good time, the kind of show you'll want to watch repeatedly to catch a line you missed the first time."

References

External links 

 
 The Middleblog written by Javier Grillo-Marxuach

2000s American comedy-drama television series
2000s American comic science fiction television series
2008 American television series debuts
2008 American television series endings
ABC Family original programming
American superhero television series
Television series by Disney–ABC Domestic Television
Television shows based on comics
Television shows featuring puppetry